is the 15th single by Japanese singer Maki Goto. It was released on 7 June 2006 with the catalog number PKCP-5066. The Single "V" was released two weeks later on 21 June 2006 with the catalog number PKBP-5049.

"Glass no Pumps" is also the sixth track of Goto's fourth album, How to Use Sexy.

Credits 
 Glass no Pumps
 Lyrics: Tsunku
 Composer: Tsunku
 Arrangement: Shoichiro Hirata
 Love Kan Coffee
 Lyrics: Tsunku
 Composer: Tsunku
 Arrangement: Akira

CD track listing 
 ガラスのパンプス (Glass no Pumps)
 ＬＯＶＥ缶コーヒー (Love Kan Coffee)
 ガラスのパンプス(Instrumental) (Glass no Pumps (Instrumental))

DVD track listing 
 ガラスのパンプス (Glass no Pumps)
 ガラスのパンプス (Dance Shot Version)
 メイキング映像 (Making of)

External links 
 Up-Front Works discography entries: CD, DVD
 projecthello.com lyrics: Glass no Pumps, Love Kan Coffee

2006 singles
Songs written by Tsunku
Maki Goto songs
2006 songs